The dambo cisticola or cloud-scraping cisticola (Cisticola dambo) is a species of bird in the family Cisticolidae. It is found in Angola, the DRC and Zambia. Its natural habitat is subtropical or tropical seasonally wet or flooded lowland grassland.

References

dambo cisticola
Birds of Central Africa
dambo cisticola
Taxonomy articles created by Polbot